Wentworth State Park is a  public recreation area on the north shore of Lake Wentworth in Wolfeboro, New Hampshire. Activities include swimming, picnicking, non-motorized boating, and fishing. Amenities include picnic tables, grills, flush toilets and a group use area.

References

External links
Wentworth State Park New Hampshire Department of Natural and Cultural Resources

State parks of New Hampshire
Parks in Carroll County, New Hampshire
Wolfeboro, New Hampshire
Protected areas established in 1934
1934 establishments in New Hampshire